Located in Tehran, beside Laleh Park, and founded in 1976, the Carpet Museum of Iran  exhibits a variety of Persian carpets from all over Iran, dating from the 16th century to the present.

The museum's exhibition hall occupies  and its library contains approximately 7,000 books.

The museum was designed by architect Abdol-Aziz Mirza Farmanfarmaian. The perforated structure around the museum's exterior is designed both to resemble a carpet loom, and to cast shade on the exterior walls, reducing the impact of the hot summer sun on the interior temperature.

See also
Iran National Heritage Organization
List of museums in Iran

References

External links

Website of the Carpet Museum of Iran
About the Carpet Museum of Iran
Carpet Museum in Contemporary Architecture of Iran's Official website

1976 establishments in Iran
Architecture in Iran
Carpet
Persian rugs and carpets
Culture in Tehran
Museums in Tehran
Museums established in 1976
Textile museums
Abdol-Aziz Mirza Farmanfarmaian buildings